Sahid Rangasala is a multi-purpose stadium in Biratnagar, Province No. 1, Nepal. It has a capacity of 15,000 spectators. It was renovated for hosting the SAFF Women's Championship in 2019.  The stadium is home to Morang XI and Biratnagar City F.C.

History
The stadium has organised Mahendra Gold Cup (presently Birat Gold Cup) for the first time in 1961 A.D. It held the opening ceremony of Seventh National Games by the president of Nepal, Bidhya Devi Bhandari.
In preparation of the 2019 SAFF Women's Championship, Biratnagar metropolitan city invested NRs. 10 million into the renovation of the stadium.

Hosted events
 Seventh National Games (2016)
 2019 SAFF Women's Championship
 Birat Gold Cup
 regular matches of Nepal National League
 Final Stage Games of Province 1 League Qualifier

References

Football venues in Nepal
1961 establishments in Nepal